Grand Rapids is a city in Itasca County, Minnesota, United States, and it is the county seat. The population is 11,126 according to the 2020 census. Today the rapids are hidden below the dam of UPM Paper Company.

History

Grand Rapids became a logging town, as the Mississippi River provided an optimal method of log shipment to population centers. Blandin paper mill opened in 1902. The Forest History Center is a State Historic Site and a living history museum that recreates life as it was in a turn of the 20th century logging camp. Costumed interpreters guide visitors through a recreated circa 1890s logging camp to educate the public on the history of white pine logging and its relevance to today's economy. Miles of nature trails, educational naturalist programming, and an interpretive museum are also located on the site.

Old Central School, located in downtown Grand Rapids, was built in 1895 in the Richardsonian Romanesque style of architecture. The three story building served as an elementary school from 1895 to 1972. A community effort restored the building in 1984 and it now serves as a location for commerce and is listed on the National Register of Historic Places.

In 1991 Enbridge's Line 3 pipeline ruptured, spilling 1.7 million of gallons of oil into the area, including the Prairie River, in the largest inland oil spill in US history.

Geography

Major highways
The city of Grand Rapids sits at the junction of U.S. Highways 2 and 169. U.S. Highway 2 runs west towards Bemidji and east towards Duluth. U.S. Highway 169 heads south to Hill City, and ultimately towards the city of Minneapolis. In the opposite direction, U.S. Highway 169 heads up the Mesabi Range passing through Hibbing and several smaller towns along the way until it reaches the city of Virginia. Grand Rapids is also the starting point of State Highway 38, designated a National Scenic Byway by the USDOT, and marked as the Edge of the Wilderness Scenic Byway as it travels toward Effie. The following routes are located within the city of Grand Rapids.
  U.S. Highway 2
  U.S. Highway 169
  Minnesota State Highway 38 – Edge of the Wilderness Scenic Byway

Climate
The city of Grand Rapids has a Humid continental climate (Köppen Climate Classification Dfb) with warm summers and long, cold winters, typical of its location on the Mesabi Iron Range.

Demographics

2010 census
As of the census of 2010, there were 10,869 people, 4,615 households, and 2,633 families living in the city. The racial makeup of the city was 94.6% White, 0.6% African American, 1.9% Native American, 0.6% Asian, 0.3% from other races, and 2.0% from two or more races. Hispanic or Latino of any race were 1.2% of the population.

There were 4,615 households, of which 26.6% had children under the age of 18 living with them, 41.1% were married couples living together, 12.4% had a female householder with no husband present, 3.6% had a male householder with no wife present, and 42.9% were non-families. 36.5% of all households were made up of individuals, and 17.1% had someone living alone who was 65 years of age or older. The average household size was 2.20 and the average family size was 2.84.

The median age in the city was 42 years. 22.2% of residents were under the age of 18; 8.5% were between the ages of 18 and 24; 22.4% were from 25 to 44; 26% were from 45 to 64; and 20.8% were 65 years of age or older. The gender makeup of the city was 47.5% male and 52.5% female.

2000 census
As of the census of 2000, there were 7,764 people, 3,446 households, and 1,943 families living in the city. The racial makeup of the city was 95.53% White, 0.28% African American, 1.93% Native American, 0.71% Asian, 0.03% Pacific Islander, 0.39% from other races, and 1.13% from two or more races. Hispanic or Latino of any race were 0.85% of the population.

There were 3,446 households, out of which 25.6% had children under the age of 18 living with them, 41.5% were married couples living together, 11.8% had a female householder with no husband present, and 43.6% were non-families. 38.1% of all households were made up of individuals, and 20.4% had someone living alone who was 65 years of age or older. The average household size was 2.15 and the average family size was 2.82.

In the city, the population was spread out, with 22.1% under the age of 18, 10.0% from 18 to 24, 23.9% from 25 to 44, 21.0% from 45 to 64, and 23.0% who were 65 years of age or older. The median age was 41 years. For every 100 females, there were 87.0 males. For every 100 females age 18 and over, there were 81.7 males.

The median income for a household in the city was $28,991, and the median income for a family was $39,468. Males had a median income of $36,035 versus $20,759 for females. The per capita income for the city was $17,223. About 9.2% of families and 11.2% of the population were below the poverty line, including 15.1% of those under age 18 and 6.4% of those age 65 or over.

Religion
Churches in Grand Rapids include the Grand Rapids Alliance Church, the Grand Rapids Evangelical Free Church, St. Luke's Evangelical Lutheran Church, member of the Wisconsin Evangelical Lutheran Synod (WELS); St. Andrew's Lutheran Church and Zion Lutheran Churches, members of the Evangelical Lutheran Church in America (ELCA);, the United Methodist Church of Grand Rapids, St. Joseph's Roman Catholic Church, River of Life Church; Apostolic; Pentecostal and Grace Bible Chapel.

Government
Grand Rapids is represented at the federal and state level by:
 U.S. House of Representatives 8th District – by Republican Pete Stauber
 Minnesota Senate District 5 – by Republican Justin Eichorn
 Minnesota House of Representatives District 5B – by Republican Spencer Igo
It is also the county seat.

Economy

Historically, the local economy was based on timber harvesting, and to this day, Blandin Paper Mill, now owned by the Finnish-based UPM paper company, has its papermaking facilities in downtown Grand Rapids, while Ainsworth (formerly Potlach) located just outside the city limits, produced oriented strand board until it ceased operation in September 2006.

The Mesabi Range or Iron Range region of Minnesota begins with one iron mine to the southwest and a number to the northeast of the city. Although technically and geographically a member of the Iron Range, Grand Rapids and its economy has been historically based on paper manufacturing and other wood products. Its current economy also has a large tourist footing, with many local resorts, four golf courses, over one million acres (4,000 km2) of public and industrial forestlands that provide excellent regional hunting, and more than 1,000 lakes for fishing. It also is the service center for 46,000 people due to a large seasonal and weekend population of summer residences on surrounding lakes, and a number of smaller bedroom communities located near Grand Rapids.

Annual tourism events
 Home & Cabin Show - March
 White Oak Classic Dog Sled Race – March
 Children's Fair - April
 Bluegrass Music in the Pines Festival - June 
 Wizard of Oz Festival – June
 Timberman Triathlon - July
 Northern Mn Swap Meet & Car Show – July
 Tall Timber Days – August
 Grand Slam of Golf Tournament – August
 Threshing & Antique Show - August
 Bargains are Great on 38 - September
 National Ruffed Grouse Society Annual Hunt – October
 WinterGlo Festival - December

Education

The public school district is ISD 318. West Elementary, East Elementary, Robert J. Elkington Middle School, and Grand Rapids High School are located within the city limits. Parochial schools include St. Joseph's Catholic School. Minnesota North College - Itasca serves the community.

Media

Local radio stations
The following radio stations are based in Grand Rapids. The city is also served by many other radio stations from the Iron Range area.
 KOZY 1320 AM – Talk/Oldies
 K201IX FM 88.1, Simulcasting Duluth's Contemporary Christian KDNW owned by the University of Northwestern – St Paul
 KMFY 96.9 FM – Adult Contemporary
 KAXE 91.7 FM – Public Radio (first rural public radio station in the United States)
 WDKE 96.1 FM – Country
 K256CW FM 99.1, Simulcasting Duluth's Christian talk and teaching KDNI owned by the University of Northwestern – St Paul
 KBAJ 105.5 FM – Classic Rock

Newspapers
 Grand Rapids Herald-Review – Published on Sundays and Wednesdays.

Television stations
Grand Rapids TV is primarily fed in from Duluth, MN television stations, but some cable subscribers also receive Bemidji, MN & Minneapolis, MN television stations as well. Local government and community events are covered by the local community television station. Television stations available in Grand Rapids are:
 KAWE 9 – PBS station based in Bemidji.
 KRII 11 – NBC station serving Chisholm/Hibbing (multiplexed into several digital subchannels; 11.1 rebroadcasts KBJR-TV NBC 6 of Duluth & 11.3 rebroadcasts KDLH CBS 3 of Duluth).
 KCCW 12 – CBS station serving Walker/Bemidji/Brainerd (rebroadcast of WCCO-TV CBS 4 of Minneapolis).
 WIRT 13 – ABC station serving Hibbing (rebroadcast of WDIO ABC 10 of Duluth).
 K29EB 29 – Translator of KQDS-TV FOX 21 of Duluth.
 WRPT 31 – PBS station serving Hibbing (rebroadcast of WDSE PBS 8 of Duluth).

Notable people

 Bill Baker, member of the Miracle on Ice 1980 U.S. Olympic Hockey Team
 Chilton C. Baker, member of the Minnesota House of Representatives
 Hugh Beaumont, known for Leave it to Beaver 
 Jon Casey, professional hockey player for the Minnesota North Stars 
 Judy Garland, iconic actress and singer, born June 10, 1922, in Grand Rapids
 Alex Goligoski, current professional hockey player for the Minnesota Wild
 Lois Hall, actress
 Trent Klatt, played in NHL
 Robert N. Lemen, member of the Minnesota House of Representatives
 Don Lucia, hockey coach at the University of Minnesota
 Jeff Nielsen, professional hockey player for the Minnesota Wild
 Norman Ornstein, political scientist
 Jim Pehler, Minnesota state legislator
 Dick Pesonen, professional football player
 Janelle Pierzina, Big Brother television series cast member
 Norman Rudolph Prahl, Minnesota state legislator
 Jon Rohloff, professional hockey player for the Boston Bruins
 Dusty Rychart, basketball player for the Cairns Taipans
 Granville Van Dusen, actor

References

External links

 City of Grand Rapids official website
 Grand Rapids Herald Review
 VisitGrandRapids.com

 
Cities in Minnesota
Cities in Itasca County, Minnesota
Minnesota populated places on the Mississippi River
County seats in Minnesota
Mining communities in Minnesota